Terence C. Shanahan (born 5 December 1951) is an English former professional footballer who played in the Football League, as a forward.

In 1980 he was contracted to play with ASL expansion team the Phoenix Fire, but the team folded in pre-season.

References

Sources

1951 births
Living people
Footballers from Paddington
English footballers
Association football forwards
Ipswich Town F.C. players
Blackburn Rovers F.C. players
Halifax Town A.F.C. players
Chesterfield F.C. players
Millwall F.C. players
AFC Bournemouth players
Aldershot F.C. players
English Football League players
Phoenix Fire (soccer) players